Assem Salam (1924 – 5 November 2012); (عاصم سلام) was a Lebanese civil engineer, architect and author. He graduated from the University of Cambridge in 1950. Asem used patterns and shapes from the Islamic tradition in his works.

Education
Graduated from the University of Cambridge, England, with a degree in Architecture, in 1950.

Career
 Designed the Saray of Sidon (1965)
 Designed the Khashoggi Mosque in the Horsh Beirut neighborhood (1968)
 Designed the dormitories for Broumana High School (1966)

Positions and Roles
He held the position of member of the Higher Planning Council within the Ministry of Planning between 1961 and 1977.
He was a member of the Higher Urban Planning Council (1964–1986), and a member of the Council for Development and Reconstruction (1977–1983).
He was a member of the Reconstruction Committee of the commercial city center of Beirut (1977–1986).

Selected writings
Shared with others
Emaar Beirut – The Missed Opportunity (1992)

Single production
The Beirut Emaar Methodology – Preliminary research into the right paths and suggested alternatives (1995)
Reconstruction and the Public Interest – In Architecture and the City (1995)

See also
Mardiros Altounian
 Ammar Khammash
 Farouk Yaghmour
 list of Lebanese architects

References

1924 births
2012 deaths
Lebanese architects
Lebanese civil engineers
Lebanese philanthropists
20th-century philanthropists